Oghuldara is a village in Lachin district of Azerbaijan. Between 17 May 1992 and 1 December 2020, the entire district was under Armenian control.

References 

Populated places in Lachin District